One Day in the Life of Ivan Denisovich is a 1970 biographical drama film based on the novel by Aleksandr Solzhenitsyn with the same name.

Plot 
The film stars Tom Courtenay as the title character, a prisoner in the Soviet gulag system in the 1950s who endures
a long prison sentence. It tells of a routine day in his life.

Cast 
Tom Courtenay as Ivan Denisovich Shukhov
Espen Skjønberg as Tiurin
Alf Malland as Fetiukov
 as Senka
Jo Skønberg as Gopchik
 as Eino
Torstein Rustdal as Vaino
James Maxwell as Captain
Alfred Burke as Alyosha
Eric Thompson as Tsetzar
John Cording as Pavlo
Matthew Guinness as Kilgas
Roy Bjørnstad
Paul Connell
Sverre Hansen
Wolfe Morris
Kjell Stormoen
Caspar Wrede

Reception
Roger Greenspun, in a respectful but unenthusiastic review for The New York Times, spoke highly of the cinematography, the "intelligent exploitation of realistic locations," and "estimable performances" by Courtenay and Skjonberg, but said that the movie  carries "the aura of an almost official view of high quality, as if this were how an important movie made from an important novel ought to look."

Banned in Finland 

Finnish film director Jörn Donner tried to get the film to Finland, but the Finnish Board of Film banned the showing of the film. In 1972, Donner complained to the Supreme Administrative Court of Finland. The Supreme Administrative Court voted for the banning 5–4 on 28 February 1972. In 1972 and 1974, Swedish television showed the film, and the Swedish television mast in Åland was shut down during the movie to prevent Finns from seeing the film.

The director of the Finnish Board of Film, Jerker Eeriksson, said that the ban of the film was political because it harmed Finnish–Soviet relations. The director, Caspar Wrede, who then lived in England, refused to campaign against the ban to avoid bad publicity abroad.

The film was shown in Finland in 1993 and 1994 in the Orion movie theater in Helsinki, as well as in the cinema club in Vaasa. Finnish television showed the film in 1996 on the TV1 YLE channel.

Bibliography

References

External links 
 
 
 
 Donner: Solzhenitsyn oli räjähde: The interview of Jörn Donner about the prohibition of the film in Finland.

1970 films
1970 drama films
British prison drama films
Norwegian drama films
English-language Norwegian films
Films based on works by Aleksandr Solzhenitsyn
Films based on Russian novels
Films about the Soviet Union in the Stalin era
Films set in the 1950s
Gulag in literature and arts
Films with screenplays by Ronald Harwood
1970s prison films
Films scored by Arne Nordheim
1970s English-language films
1970s British films